Antonio Salazar Gómez, (born January 15, 1949) is a retired Mexican luchador, or professional wrestler who works as the ring announcer for Consejo Mundial de Lucha Libre's (CMLL) Sunday shows in Arena Coliseo. He is best known under the ring name Tony Salazar, although he has also competed as Señor Tormenta, El Nene and the masked Ulises during his wrestling career. In his career, he has held the NWA World Middleweight Championship twice, and the NWA World Light Heavyweight Championship once.

Professional wrestling career
Tony Salazar made his professional wrestling debut in 1965 and soon after began working regularly for Empresa Mexicana de Lucha Libre, the world's oldest and Mexico's largest wrestling promotion. On August 13, 1978 Tony Salazar defeated Ringo Mendoza to win the NWA World Middleweight Championship, holding the title until February 3, 1979 when Mendoza regained it. Salazar would have an additional reign as Middleweight champion in 1981 when he won it from Sangre Chicana on January 18 and lost it to Chicana on March 13, 1981. The following month Salazar defeated Alfonso Dantés to win the NWA World Light Heavyweight Championship, the most prestigious title promoted in Mexico at the time. Salazar's run with the Light Heavyweight title lasted for almost a year until American David Morgan won it on March 22, 1982. Following his title loss Salazar worked as the enmascarado character Ulíses for some years, retiring in the early 1990s.

Tony Salazar is currently the ring announcer for Consejo Mundial de Lucha Libre's (CMLL; Previously known as EMLL) Sunday night shows in Arena Coliseo in Mexico City, Mexico as well as working behind the scenes as one of the people responsible for putting the shows together every Sunday.

Family
Tony Salazar is the father of CMLL wrestler Magnus, the uncle of AAA wrestler Myzteziz, as well as Argenis, Argos and Astro Boy. He is the brother-in-law of their father who wrestled as Dr. Karonte.

Championships and accomplishments
Empresa Mexicana de la Lucha Libre
NWA World Middleweight Championship (2 times)
NWA World Light Heavyweight Championship (1 time)
Copa Bobby Bonales (2018)

Luchas de Apuestas record

References

1949 births
Living people
Mexican male professional wrestlers
Professional wrestlers from Mexico City
20th-century professional wrestlers
NWA World Light Heavyweight Champions
NWA World Middleweight Champions